Juventus IF was a Swedish football club located in Västerås. They merged into IFK Stocksund in 2016.

Background
Juventus Idrottsförening (Juventus Athletic Association) was formed in 1948 in by Italians who came to Sweden during the 1940s, and the name referred to Juventus FC from Torino in Italy.

Their biggest sporting success came under the management team headed by chairman Franco Pertunaj. In 2008 Juventus IF won the "triple" by gaining promotion to Division 4, winning the VLT Cup and also winning the DM (district championship) in Futsal. In 2011 another significant achievement was made by gaining promotion via the play-offs to Division 3.

They played their home matches at the Råby IP in Västerås.

The club was affiliated to Västmanlands Fotbollförbund.

Season to season

Footnotes

Sport in Västerås
Italian diaspora in Europe
Diaspora football clubs in Sweden
Association football clubs established in 1948
1948 establishments in Sweden
Defunct football clubs in Sweden
Association football clubs disestablished in 2016
2016 disestablishments in Sweden
Italian association football clubs outside Italy